Jafarabad-e Chelik (also Romanized as Ja‘farābād-e Chelīk; also known as Ja‘farābād) is a village in Marhemetabad-e Jonubi Rural District, in the Central District of Miandoab County, West Azerbaijan Province, Iran. At the 2006 census, the village's population was 394 individuals and 85 families. The village is populated by Azerbaijanis and Kurds.

References 

Populated places in Miandoab County

Kurdish settlements in West Azerbaijan Province